Operation Shining Express was the June 2003 deployment of an American Joint Task Force task, consisting of the amphibious assault ship USS Kearsarge (LHD-3), the 3rd Battalion 2nd Marines (3/2), and a detachment of HH-60G helicopters and Pararescuemen from the 56th Rescue Squadron to evacuate U.S. embassy personnel and American citizens during the Second Liberian Civil War. The deployment was announced on June 12, 2003 and lasted until July 2003.

It followed the successful 1990 rescue effort in Liberia, Operation Sharp Edge.

Notable Participants
Robert J. O'Neill (U.S. Navy SEAL)

References

 

History of Liberia
Non-combat military operations involving the United States
2003 in the United States
2003 in Liberia
United States Marine Corps in the 21st century
Non-combatant evacuation operations